Sergio Raúl Melnick Israel (born 27 July 1951) is a Chilean politician, economist, businessman, and writer. He currently serves as a councilmember for Las Condes.

Biography
In the late 1980s he served as Minister of Planning in the dictatorship of Pinochet.

He referred to himself as a libertarian in a 21 December 2020 Twitter post.

References

External links
 

1951 births
Chilean politicians
National Advance politicians
Republican Party (Chile, 2019) politicians
University of Chile alumni
University of California, Los Angeles
20th-century Chilean politicians
21st-century Chilean politicians
Living people
Chilean Jews
Chilean libertarians
Chilean anti-communists
Ministers of the military dictatorship of Chile (1973–1990)
Municipal councillors of Las Condes
Chilean political commentators